Denver Academy is an independent, private day school serving grades 2-12 in Denver, Colorado.

Denver Academy is a registered 501(c)(3).

History
Denver Academy was founded in 1972, and occupied a schoolhouse in the Washington Park area of Denver until relocating to a  historic property in southeast Denver in 2001.

Divisions
The school is organized into four different divisions, each according to grade level
Lower School (grades 1-5)
6th Grade
Middle School (grades 7-8)
High School (grades 9-12)

Athletics 
Denver Academy is in CHSAA 3A and 2A divisions and is the Mile High League.

References

High schools in Denver
Private high schools in Colorado
Private elementary schools in Colorado
Private middle schools in Colorado
Educational institutions established in 1972